Jesús González Rubio (died April 26, 1874) was a professor of music in Guadalajara, Mexico, who is best known for having composed the Jarabe Tapatío, also known in the United States as the "Mexican Hat Dance".

He established his own private school in Guadalajara for talented young musicians in the early  19th century, among them, Clemente Aguirre (1828-1900), who subsequently also became a noted music instructor and composer who influenced later musicians.

Gonzalez-Rubio died on April 26, 1874, in Guadalajara.  His remains were interred at the Templo de San Francisco de Asis.

References
State of Jalisco Site - Dances and Costumes of Jalisco (in Spanish)
Guadalajara: Apuntes históricos, biográficos, estadísticos y descriptivos, by Joaquín Romo, published 1888 by Ireneo Paz, Guadalajara (Mexico) Digitized at Google Books

Musicians from Guadalajara, Jalisco
Mexican composers
Mexican male composers
Year of birth missing
1874 deaths